John A. Dawson (1826 – October 31, 1902) was a Canadian politician, merchant and taxidermist.

Dawson was educated in Pictou. He was concurrently elected to the House of Commons of Canada with James William Carmichael in 1874 as a Member of the Liberal Party to represent the riding of Pictou. He lost in the elections of 1878 and 1882.

Electoral history

References

External links

1902 deaths
Liberal Party of Canada MPs
Members of the House of Commons of Canada from Nova Scotia
1826 births
People from Pictou County